One False Move is a 1992 American crime thriller film directed by Carl Franklin and co-written by Billy Bob Thornton. The film stars Thornton alongside Bill Paxton and Cynda Williams. The low-budget production was about to be released straight to home video when it was finished, but became popular through word of mouth, convincing the distributor to give the film a theatrical release. Film critic Gene Siskel voted this film as his favorite of 1992.

Plot 
Three criminals, Ray, Pluto and Fantasia (Ray's girlfriend), commit six brutal murders over the course of one night in Los Angeles as they seek a cache of money and cocaine. The trio leave for Houston to sell the cocaine to a friend of Pluto's.

The LAPD Detectives Cole and McFeely are investigating the case. After getting a few leads, they discover that the three are possibly headed for Star City, Arkansas. The LAPD contacts the Star City Police Chief, Dale "Hurricane" Dixon, who is excited about the case, as it gives him an opportunity to do "some real police work". He is well-known throughout the small county, chatting with locals while on patrol. The detectives fly to Star City and meet Dixon. He attempts to ingratiate himself with the detectives, whom he reveres, while they pretend to respect him.

After stopping at a convenience store, a state trooper pulls over and attempts to arrest Ray and Pluto but Fantasia kills him as she is asked to get out of the car. Word of the trooper's murder gets to the detectives in Star City, and the trio review surveillance photos of Ray and Fantasia in the store confirming their identity. Dixon informs the detectives that Fantasia is Lila Walker and she grew up in Star City. He recalls she was a troubled youth who left for Hollywood with dreams of an acting career.

The detectives sense Dixon may know Fantasia better than he is letting on after they stop by her mother's house. They question Fantasia's mother and brother Ronnie about Fantasia's whereabouts and if she had contacted them recently. They also meet a young boy, Byron, who is revealed to be Lila's young son. The detectives suspect that Lila will be coming home to see him.

Ray, Fantasia and Pluto arrive in Houston to sell the drugs as planned. Fantasia takes a bus to Star City. Angry that their buyers are reneging on the previously agreed upon price for the cocaine, Pluto and Ray kill them and flee. They drive to Star City to meet up with Fantasia and plan their next move.

When Fantasia arrives in Star City, she hides at a rural house. Dixon confronts her, and it is revealed that the boy is Dixon and Lila's son, conceived during an affair years earlier. After tense conversation, they make a deal. She will lure Ray and Pluto to ensure their arrest and in exchange, Dixon will help her leave town.

Pluto and Ray arrive at the house and are immediately confronted by an armed Dixon. Pluto stabs Dixon in the stomach and Dixon shoots Pluto. Ray draws his gun and runs outside while shooting at Dixon. The two fire at each other, but Fantasia stops Dixon from killing Ray, only to have Ray errantly shoot her in the head. Seriously wounded, Dixon steadies himself and shoots Ray to death. Pluto walks outside and falls dead in the grass. Dixon calls for help with his police radio, and the LAPD detectives arrive, amazed at what Dixon has accomplished. Byron walks over and talks to Dixon as he lies bleeding, and he asks the boy to tell him about himself.

Cast 

In addition, Robert Anthony Bell plays Byron, Dale and Lila's young son.

Critical reaction 
Hal Hinson, writing for The Washington Post, praised the film: "'One False Move' is a thriller with a hair-trigger sense of tension. Directed by newcomer Carl Franklin, its power comes from the stripped-down simplicity of its style and the unblinking savagery of its violence."  Film critic Roger Ebert praised the film's director in his review: "It is a powerful directing job. He starts with an extraordinary screenplay and then finds the right tones and moods for every scene, realizing it's not the plot we care about, it’s the people." The film was nominated for the Grand Prix of the Belgian Syndicate of Cinema Critics.

As of December 2022, One False Move holds a rating of 94% on Rotten Tomatoes based on 53 reviews. The consensus summarizes: "One False Move makes nary a misstep as it unfurls a seedy caper with hard-hitting action and sly humor, marking an arresting debut for director Carl Franklin."

References

External links
 
 
 
 
 
 

1992 films
1992 crime thriller films
American crime thriller films
American police detective films
American independent films
Films about interracial romance
Films set in Los Angeles
Films set in Arkansas
Films set in New Mexico
Films set in Texas
Films shot in Los Angeles
Films shot in Arkansas
Films directed by Carl Franklin
I.R.S. Media films
1992 independent films
Star City, Arkansas
1990s English-language films
1990s American films